Many of the novels and short stories written or co-written by Stephen King take place in a multiverse created by the author.

Ka 
Ka is a plot element in Stephen King's Dark Tower series. It is a word of the fictional language High Speech.

In the books, it is a mysterious force that leads all living (and unliving) creatures. It is the will of Gan, the approximate equivalent of destiny or fate, in King's fictional language of High Speech. Ka can be considered to be a guide, a destination, but is certainly not a plan—at least, not one that is known to mortals. Ka is not necessarily a force of good or evil; it manipulates both sides, and seems to have no definite morality of its own.

Concepts involving ka 
Because of the importance of ka to the world of King's Dark Tower, many phrases in the High Speech use the word ka, such as:

ka-babbies: young ka-tet members.
ka-tel: a class of apprentice gunslingers.
ka-mai: ka's fool.
ka-me: ka's wiseman; the opposite of ka-mai.
kas-ka: a prophet
ka-shume: a unique feeling that a ka-tet is destined to break soon.
te-ka: ka's friend.
Can'-Ka No Rey: the red fields of none, where the Dark Tower lies.
tet-ka can Gan: the navel (specifically, the navel of Gan).
kas-ka Gan: singer of Gan's song/ prophet of Gan.
ves-ka Gan: the Song of the Turtle.

Ka-tet 
 
A ka-tet is a group of beings brought together by ka. "We are ka-tet. We are one from many," says Roland Deschain on the day before the Battle of Algul Siento. Ka-tet is the belief that a group of people can be tied together by fate, or ka. It is said that a group has shared "khef" or the water of life. Sometimes the symbol of water is used literally, as in a ritual Roland and his ka-tet performs the night before the battle of Algul Siento. In the seventh novel, Susannah Dean, who ends up understanding ka maybe more than Roland himself, comes to the understanding that in simple terms, "ka-tet" means family.

Roland's ka-tet includes himself, Eddie Dean, Susannah Dean, Oy, and Jake Chambers. Roland's previous ka-tet included himself, Cuthbert Allgood, Jamie De Curry, and Alain Johns.

References in other works by King 
Ka is mentioned in some of King's other books, including Hearts in Atlantis, Desperation and Insomnia. The characters James Eric Gardener in The Tommyknockers and Rosie McClendon in Rose Madder also ponder ka. It is mentioned in The Stand by Judge Farris when he observes a crow outside his window that he believes is Randall Flagg shortly before he is killed by Flagg's men.

The ka-tet concept has been frequently used by King, even in books that do not use the terms ka or ka-tet, such as It, The Stand, Desperation, Insomnia, Dreamcatcher, and Duma Key.

The Purpose and the Random 

The Purpose and the Random are concepts elaborating the "grammar" of All-World introduced in Insomnia. The Purpose and the Random are driving forces on the different levels (worlds or realities) the Dark Tower connects. There are even stronger forces, like the Higher Purpose and the Higher Random. It is not totally clear whether these higher forms are multiple individual beings sharing a common aim, or if they are underlying forces not bound to personal forms. Both the Purpose and the Random have so-called agents, middlemen between ordinary human beings ("Short-Timers") and the god-like All-Timers. Clotho and Lachesis are agents of the Purpose, while Atropos is an agent of the Random. Central is the idea that the Purpose and the Random need to be in balance.

The Higher Purpose and the Higher Random 
For each field exist higher beings which seem to be god-like. While arguably Gan or Maturin would belong to the Higher Purpose, the Crimson King or It are beings of the Higher Random.

List of worlds and universes

See also
 Multiverse (Michael Moorcock)

References

External links

 The Dark Tower – Connections

Fictional populated places created by Stephen King
The Dark Tower (series)
Continuity (fiction)
Fictional universes
The Stand